The Coming Street Cemetery is located at 189 Coming Street, in Charleston, South Carolina. This Jewish cemetery, one of the oldest in the United States was founded in 1762 by Sephardi Jews and is the oldest Jewish burial ground in the South. Burials in the Coming Street Cemetery are now restricted to the few vacancies in the adjacent family plots. The cemetery was listed on the National Register of Historic Places in 1996.

The Coming Street cemetery is a private burial ground owned by Kahal Kadosh Beth Elohim Synagogue and a donation is requested in order to be given a tour of the cemetery.

References

Further reading

External links
 Coming Street Cemetery, on National Park Service's Discover Our Shared Heritage Travel Itinerary
 Coming Street Cemetery
 

Cemeteries on the National Register of Historic Places in South Carolina
Jewish cemeteries in South Carolina
Geography of Charleston, South Carolina
1762 establishments in South Carolina
National Register of Historic Places in Charleston, South Carolina
Portuguese-Jewish culture in the United States
Sephardi Jewish culture in South Carolina
Cemeteries in Charleston, South Carolina
Spanish-Jewish culture in the United States